Events from the year 1805 in the United States.

Incumbents

Federal Government 
 President: Thomas Jefferson (DR-Virginia)
 Vice President: Aaron Burr (DR-New York) (until March 4), George Clinton (DR-New York) (starting March 4)
 Chief Justice: John Marshall (Virginia)
 Speaker of the House of Representatives: Nathaniel Macon (DR-North Carolina)
 Congress: 8th (until March 4), 9th (starting March 4)

Events

 January 11 – Michigan Territory is created.
 February 11 – Jean Baptiste Charbonneau, son of Sacagawea is born with Meriwether Lewis aiding in the baby's delivery.
 February 15 – Harmony Society formally established in the U.S. at Harmony, Pennsylvania.
 March 1 – Justice Samuel Chase is acquitted of impeachment charges by the U.S. Senate.
 March 3 – Louisiana Territory is created.
 March 4 – Thomas Jefferson is sworn in for a second term as President of the United States, and George Clinton is sworn in as Vice President of the United States.
 April 7 – The Lewis and Clark Expedition departs Fort Mandan, beginning their journey to the Pacific Ocean.
 April 27 – Battle of Derne: United States Marines and Berbers attack the Tripolitan city of Derna (The "Shores of Tripoli").
 June 4 – The First Barbary War ends between Tripoli and the United States of America.
 June 11 – Detroit burns to the ground; most of the city is destroyed.
 June 13 – Lewis and Clark Expedition: Scouting ahead of the expedition, Meriwether Lewis and four companions sight the Great Falls of the Missouri River, confirming they are heading in the right direction.
 June 30 – Michigan Territory is effective.
 July 4 – Louisiana Territory is effective.
 October 18 – Lewis and Clark Expedition: William Clark sights Mount Hood through the fog, some 45 miles (72 km) away.
 November 7 – The Lewis and Clark Expedition arrives at the Pacific Ocean.

Ongoing
 First Barbary War (1801–1805)
 Lewis and Clark Expedition (1804–1806)

Births
 January 8 – Orson Hyde, religious leader (died 1878)
 February 11 – Jean Baptiste Charbonneau, son of Sacagawea, explorer, guide, fur trapper, trader and military scout (died 1866)
 February 18 – Louis M. Goldsborough, admiral (died 1877)
 March 23 – Sears Cook Walker, mathematician and astronomer (died 1853)
 June 14 – Robert Anderson, United States Army officer during the American Civil War (died 1871 in France)
 June 15 – William B. Ogden, Chicago politician and railroad executive (died 1877)
 July 10 – Jacob M. Howard, U.S. Senator from Michigan from 1862 to 1871 (died 1871)
 September 6 – Horatio Greenough, sculptor (died 1852)
 September 19 – John Stevens Cabot Abbott, historian, pastor and pedagogical writer (died 1877)
 October 9 – William M. Gwin, U.S. Senator from California from 1850 to 1855 and from 1857 to 1861 (died 1885)
 November 28 – John Lloyd Stephens, traveler, diplomat and Mayanist archaeologist (died 1852)
 December 2 – Cicero Price, commodore (died 1888)
 December 10 – William Lloyd Garrison, abolitionist (died 1879)
 December 12 – Henry Wells, businessman, founder of Wells Fargo (died 1878)
 December 23 – Joseph Smith, Jr., religious leader, founder of the Church of Jesus Christ of Latter-day Saints (died 1844)

Deaths
 January 7 – Ebenezer Sproat, Continental Army officer, pioneer in the Ohio Country (born 1752)
 January 9 – Noble Wimberly Jones, physician and delegate to the Continental Congress in 1781 and 1782 (born c. 1723)
 February 4 – John Sloss Hobart, jurist and politician (born 1738)
 June 17 – John Ames, captain in the American Revolutionary War (born 1738)
 August 28 – Christopher Gadsden, statesman (born 1724)
 September 27 – William Moultrie, general (born 1730)
 November – Robert Alexander, Maryland politician (born c. 1740)

See also
 Timeline of the Lewis and Clark Expedition
 Timeline of United States history (1790–1819)

References

Further reading
 John Lathrop. Effects of Lightning on the House of Capt. Daniel Merry, and Several Other Houses in the Vicinity, on the Evening of the 11th of May 1805. Memoirs of the American Academy of Arts and Sciences, Vol. 3, No. 1 (1809), pp. 86–91
 William Lattimore to his Constituents, 1805. The American Historical Review, Vol. 29, No. 3 (April, 1924), pp. 506–510
 W. H. G. Armytage. A Sheffield Quaker in Philadelphia 1804-1806. Pennsylvania History, Vol. 17, No. 3 (1950), pp. 192–205
 Rollo G. Silver. Belcher & Armstrong Set up Shop: 1805. Studies in Bibliography, Vol. 4, (1951/1952), pp. 201–204
 Dorothy Wollon, Margaret Kinard. Sir Augustus J. Foster and "The Wild Natives of the Woods," 1805-1807. The William and Mary Quarterly, Third Series, Vol. 9, No. 2 (April, 1952), pp. 191–214
 Jerry W. Knudson. The Jeffersonian Assault on the Federalist Judiciary, 1802–1805; Political Forces and Press Reaction. The American Journal of Legal History, Vol. 14, No. 1 (January, 1970), pp. 55–75
 Charles Merrill Mount. Gilbert Stuart in Washington: With a Catalogue of His Portraits Painted between December 1803 and July 1805. Records of the Columbia Historical Society, Washington, D.C., Vol. 71/72, The 48th separately bound book (1971/1972), pp. 81–127
 John W. Wagner. New York City Concert Life, 1801-5. American Music, Vol. 2, No. 2 (Summer, 1984), pp. 53–69
 Linda K. Kerber. The Paradox of Women's Citizenship in the Early Republic: The Case of Martin vs. Massachusetts, 1805. The American Historical Review, Vol. 97, No. 2 (April, 1992), pp. 349–378
 Trey Berry. The Expedition of William Dunbar and George Hunter along the Ouachita River, 1804-1805. The Arkansas Historical Quarterly, Vol. 62, No. 4, The Louisiana Purchase: Empires, Nations, Communities (Winter, 2003), pp. 386–403
 John Craig Hammond. "They Are Very Much Interested in Obtaining an Unlimited Slavery": Rethinking the Expansion of Slavery in the Louisiana Purchase Territories, 1803-1805. Journal of the Early Republic, Vol. 23, No. 3 (Autumn, 2003), pp. 353–380

External links
 

 
1800s in the United States
United States
United States
Years of the 19th century in the United States